Free Radio Birmingham is an Independent Local Radio station based in Birmingham, England, owned and operated by Bauer as part of the Hits Radio network. It broadcasts to Birmingham and the West Midlands.

As of December 2022, the station has a weekly audience of 190,000 listeners according to RAJAR.

History

Launched on 19 February 1974, on 261 metres medium wave, (1152kHz) and 94.8 MHz FM, BRMB was the fourth independent local commercial radio station to begin broadcasting in Britain after LBC, Capital London and Radio Clyde. Broadcasting a mix of popular music with local news, live football coverage, information and specialist output, the station became popular amongst residents in Birmingham and later changed its main FM frequency from 94.8 to 96.4 in 1986.

The original station name, BRMB, was not an initialism (contrary to popular belief – some believed it stood for Birmingham Radio, Midlands Broadcasting). Instead, the original company, Birmingham Broadcasting Ltd., wanted something that combined a US-style call-sign with the company name – e.g. Birmingham – (BRM) and broadcasting – (B); equalling BRMB.

Presenters such as Ed Doolan, Les Ross, Phil Upton and Tony Butler became regulars on the station – Les Ross was the UK's longest-serving breakfast show presenter, presenting BRMB's flagship weekday show from March 1976 to March 1989, followed by a second
stint between August 1993 to September 2002. Former head of sport Tom Ross also found fame on the station when it began broadcasting live commentary of West Midlands football matches every Saturday afternoon – Ian Crocker was also involved in the coverage early on.

In 1988, as a response to government disapproval of the simulcasting of programming on both FM and mediumwave, a sister station was launched on the 1152 kHz frequency. Xtra AM became BRMB's 'gold' service, playing classic hits, while BRMB itself began to cater for a younger
audience. At this stage, BRMB was part of Midlands Radio plc, which was bought out along with Radio Trent, Leicester Sound and Mercia Sound by Capital Radio in 1993. However, they sold the other stations to the GWR Group whilst Capital kept hold of BRMB and Xtra AM. Xtra was on the air for nine years until the majority of its programming was switched to London, where it was simulcast with Capital Gold.

On 8 August 2008, it was confirmed that due to competition 'conflict of interests' in the West Midlands (and in other areas), BRMB would be sold by Global, along with other West Midlands owned GCap/Global stations Mercia FM, Wyvern FM, Heart 106 and Beacon Radio. In July 2009, the station was sold officially to a company backed by Lloyds Development Capital and Phil Riley which was named Orion Media.

On 9 January 2012, Orion Media announced that BRMB would be rebranded as Free Radio Birmingham, along with its sister West Midlands stations Beacon, Mercia and Wyvern. The BRMB brand, together with neighbouring stations Mercia, Beacon and Wyvern, were phased out on Wednesday 21 March 2012 in preparation for the rebrand, which took place at 7pm on Monday 26 March 2012. Live football commentaries on Aston Villa and Birmingham City matches continued to be broadcast on Free Radio 80s on AM and DAB until the end of the 2014–15 season.

On 6 May 2016, the station's owners, Orion, announced they had been bought by Bauer for an undisclosed fee, reportedly between £40 and £50 million.

In February 2017, most of Free Radio's off-peak networked output from Birmingham was replaced by programmes originating from Bauer's Manchester studios.

In May 2019, following OFCOM's decision to relax local content obligations from commercial radio, Bauer announced Free Radio's Birmingham breakfast show would be shared with the sister station in Shropshire and the Black Country from 8 July 2019, presented by Dan Morrissey. The localised weekday drivetime shows were initially replaced by a single regional show, presented by Andy Goulding.

Regional weekend afternoon shows were axed in favour of additional network programming. As of 2 September 2019, further networked output replaced the weekday drivetime show.

On 23 November 2021, Bauer announced the two Hits at Breakfast shows would be merged into one regional show across all four Free Radio licences, following the departure of Dan Morrissey. The merger was permitted under OFCOM's local content guidelines.

The new Hits at Breakfast show for the West Midlands, presented by John Dalziel and Roisin McCourt, began on Monday 29 November 2021. The Birmingham station retains opt-outs for local news, traffic updates and advertising.

Bauer also announced it would move Free Radio from its Brindleyplace studios in the city centre to a smaller facility at 54 Hagley Road in Edgbaston at the end of 2021.

Programming
All networked programming originates from Bauer's Manchester studios.

Regional programming, under the Hits at Breakfast banner, is produced and broadcast from Bauer's Birmingham studios weekdays from 6-10am, presented by John Dalziel and Roisin McCourt.

News
Bauer's Birmingham newsroom broadcasts local news bulletins for the city hourly from 6am-7pm on weekdays, from 7am-1pm on Saturdays and Sundays. Headlines are broadcast on the half hour during weekday breakfast and drivetime shows, alongside traffic bulletins.

National bulletins from Sky News Radio are carried overnight with bespoke networked bulletins on weekend afternoons, usually originating from Bauer's Leeds newsroom.

Station Information
BRMB was originally based in Aston Road North, in the Aston area of Birmingham, near the Spaghetti Junction. These were the former Alpha Television Studios, the home of ATV and ABC Weekend Television until 1970.

The current Free Radio studios are based in the Brindleyplace development near Broad Street in Birmingham city centre. Since August 2011, local programming for the Coventry and Warwickshire station has been produced and broadcast from Birmingham.

The FM signal – 10kW ERP – is broadcast from the Sutton Coldfield transmitter, and can be received throughout a large part of the West Midlands.

Events
Free in Birmingham organises a number of annual public events including the Walkathon and the annual Live concerts at the LG Arena. The station also sponsors the Bupa Great Birmingham Run and the Acorns Midnight Walk.

Notable past presenters

 Ed Doolan MBE (1974–1981) (deceased) 
 Les Ross MBE (1976–2002, now at Boom Radio)
 Graham Torrington (later at BBC WM and BBC Radio Devon, now at Boom Radio and North Derbyshire Radio)
 John Slater (1980-1991)
 Elliott Webb (1997–2009) (now at BBC Hereford and Worcester)
 Margherita Taylor (now at Classic FM)
 Carlos (later at Smooth Radio, now at Heart 70s)
 Harriet Scott (now at Magic Radio)
 Paul Hollins (now at Smooth Radio)
 Jeremy Kyle (now at TalkTV)
 Dave Jamieson (now at Boom Radio)
 Tom Binns
 Tim Shaw (later at Rock FM)
 Mark Crossley (now at Absolute Radio)
 Graeme Smith (later at Real Radio North West, now at Capital Liverpool)
 Robin Banks
 James Merritt (now at Virgin Radio UK)
 Ed Nell (later at Free Radio Black Country & Shropshire, now at BBC Radio Nottingham)
 Jo Russell (now at Gem)
 John Howard (later at BBC Radio 4)
 Sam and Mark (now at CBBC)
 Adrian Juste (1974–1977) (Later with BBC Radio 1)

References

External links
 Free
 MDS975.co.uk – BRMB Radio
 MDS975.co.uk – Xtra AM

Bauer Radio
Hits Radio
Radio stations established in 1974
Radio stations in Birmingham, West Midlands